Niels Onstad (26 March 1909 – 17 June 1978) was a Norwegian shipowner and art collector.

Biography
Niels Onstad was born in Kristiania (now Oslo), Norway. Onstad played football for SFK Lyn in his younger days. He played as defender on the club's first-team, including a feature in the 1928 Norwegian Football Cup final. 

In 1935, together with his brother Haakon Onstad (1901-1980), he started the shipping company, Niels Onstad Tank Rederi A / S, which later was named Niels Onstads Tankrederi with headquarters in Oslo. Haakon Onstad had entered ship owning in 1932 with the Pan Gothia but because of the uncertain financial times the ship was given Swedish registry under Rederi A/B Pagota. In 1940, during the Occupation of Norway by Nazi Germany, Niels Onstad moved to New York City where he worked for the Norwegian Shipping and Trade Mission (Nortraship). Haakon Onstad relocated to Kungsbacka, Sweden, where he formed Rederi A/B Kungsoil and Rederi A/B Monacus.

In 1956, Niels Onstad married Sonja Henie. Onstad, whose mother had been a painter, had many contacts in the Norwegian art world, including Edvard Munch. Together, Onstad and Henie established the Henie-Onstad Art Centre (Henie Onstad Kunstsenter) at Høvikodden in Bærum southwest of Oslo.

The ship Susanne Onstad was featured in the movie King Kong from 1976. The Susanne Onstad was the oil tanker that brought King Kong from Skull Island to the USA.

References

Related reading
Hovdenakk, Per;  Susanne Rajka, Øivind Storm Bjerke (2007) Henie-Onstad kunstsenter (Oslo: Grøndahl og Dreyer) 

1909 births
1978 deaths
Businesspeople from Oslo in shipping
Norwegian footballers
Lyn Fotball players
Norwegian expatriates in the United States
Norwegian art collectors
Association footballers not categorized by position
Collectors from Oslo